Riverview Plaza, formerly known as Wuhan Tiandi A1, is a 376-meter tall skyscraper in Wuhan, China. It is currently the third-tallest building in the city, behind Wuhan Greenland Center and Wuhan Center.

References

See also
List of tallest buildings in China

Skyscraper office buildings in Wuhan
Skyscraper hotels in Wuhan
Skyscrapers in Wuhan